This is an article of notable issues relating to the terrestrial environment of Earth in 2021. They relate to environmental events such as natural disasters, environmental sciences such as ecology and geoscience with a known relevance to contemporary influence of humanity on Earth, environmental law, conservation, environmentalism with major worldwide impact and environmental issues.

Events

Environmental disasters

Environmental sciences

Geosciences, biotechnology, anthropology and geoengineering

Environmental policy 

 5 February – Australia's Northern Territory bans seabed mining in its coastal waters.

Predicted and scheduled events 
 1–12 November – 2021 United Nations Climate Change Conference

International goals 
A list of − mostly self-imposed and legally voluntary or unenforceable − goals related to the environment and/or environmental sciences due by or established in 2021 as decided by multinational corporate associations or international governance entities and their status:

Result reports

A session of the United Nations General Assembly decided that the theme and Sustainable Development Goals discussed at the 2021 High-level Political Forum will be "Sustainable and resilient recovery from the COVID-19 pandemic that promotes the economic, social and environmental dimensions of sustainable development: building an inclusive and effective path for the achievement of the 2030 Agenda in the context of the decade of action and delivery for sustainable development".

Goal-oriented coordination

Governmental budgets

 22 April –  Brazil's political leader, Jair Bolsonaro, or his leadership apparatus decides to cut the government's annual environmental budget by 23 % compared to the previous year, making it the lowest in the history of the nation since the 1990s and reducing means to protect the Amazon rainforest.
 3 May – It is announced that  Germany will spend an additional 5 billion euros to reduce emissions from the steel industry and will finance steelmakers' hydrogen production projects.

See also

General
2020s in environmental history
2021 in climate change
Green recovery
2021 in space
List of environmental issues
Outline of environmental studies

Natural environment
List of large volcanic eruptions in the 21st century
Lists of extinct animals#Recent extinction
:Category:Species described in 2021
:Category:Protected areas established in 2021

Artificial development
Timeline of sustainable energy research 2020–present
2021 in rail transport
Human impact on the environment

References

 
Environmental